Ernest Edward West (July 7, 1867 – July 16, 1914) was American college football player and coach. He was the organizer, head coach, and player on first football team at Georgia Tech.

West was born in Rome, Georgia in 1867 and graduated from the United States Naval Academy in 1888. After graduation, he resigned his commission and practiced law in Georgia before becoming a professor at the Georgia school of Technology. In 1892, he organized Georgia Tech's first football team, acted as coach and captain, and played halfback. It was only season he coach or played for the school. During the Spanish–American War, West served as a captain of marines.

On June 14, 1914, during custody dispute over his nine-year-old daughter, West was found in a Chattanooga, Tennessee hotel room with a self-inflicted gunshot wound to the head. He survived his injuries, but died of kidney failure in Rhea Springs, Tennessee on July 17, 1914.

Head coaching record

References

External links
 

1867 births
1914 deaths
19th-century players of American football
American football halfbacks
Player-coaches
Georgia Tech Yellow Jackets football coaches
Georgia Tech Yellow Jackets football players
American military personnel of the Spanish–American War
United States Naval Academy alumni
Sportspeople from Rome, Georgia
Coaches of American football from Georgia (U.S. state)
Players of American football from Georgia (U.S. state)
Military personnel from Georgia (U.S. state)
Deaths from kidney failure